Saxe, meaning “Saxon,” may refer to:

Places

Germany
 Saxe-Lauenburg
 Saxe-Wittenberg
 Saxe-Altenburg
 Saxe-Coburg
 Saxe-Coburg and Gotha
 Saxe-Coburg-Eisenach
 Saxe-Coburg-Saalfeld
 Saxe-Eisenach
 Saxe-Eisenberg
 Saxe-Gotha
 Saxe-Gotha-Altenburg
 Saxe-Hildburghausen
 Saxe-Jena
 Saxe-Meiningen
 Saxe-Römhild
 Saxe-Saalfeld
 Saxe-Weimar
 Saxe-Weimar-Eisenach

United States
 Saxe, Virginia

Other uses
 Saxe (surname)
 Porcelaine de Saxe, the French name for Meissen porcelain

See also
 
 
 Sachs
 Sachse (disambiguation)
 Sacks (surname)
 Saks (disambiguation)
 Sax (disambiguation)
 Saxony (disambiguation)
 Small-angle X-ray scattering (SAXS)
 Zaks (disambiguation)
 Zax (disambiguation)